Kilitbahir Castle (Turkish: Kilitbahir Kalesi) is a fortress on the west side of the Dardanelles, opposite the city of Çanakkale, where there is a corresponding fortress (Kale-i Sultaniye), from which Çanakkale takes its name. The two castles were constructed by Fatih Sultan Mehmet in 1463 to control the straits at their narrowest point. Kilitbahir's name, meaning "lock of the sea", reflects this defensive purpose.

References

Gallery

External links
 Kilitbahir pictures group on Flickr

Ottoman fortifications
Forts in Turkey
Dardanelles
Buildings and structures in Çanakkale Province
Buildings and structures completed in 1463